Žaliūkės is a village in Šiauliai district municipality, in Šiauliai County, in northern Lithuania. According to the 2021 census, the village had population of 193 inhabitants.

History
In 2022, the Lithuanian parliament Seimas voted in favour to change villages administration from Šiauliai District Municipality to Šiauliai City municipality. The changes came into effect on 1 January 2023.

Demography

References

Villages in Šiauliai County